This is a list of some of the major problems in philosophy.

Meta-philosophy 

Meta (from the Greek μετά, meta, meaning "after" or "beyond") is a prefix meaning "more comprehensive" or "transcending".
In modern nomenclature, meta- can also serve as a prefix meaning self-referential, as a field of study or endeavor (metatheory: theory about a theory; metamathematics: mathematical theories about mathematics; meta-axiomatics or meta-axiomaticity: axioms about axiomatic systems; and that meta-Semantics is the study about reference to meaning and meaning to reference. The term can be used to refer to subfields of several distinct disciplines, including philosophy, linguistics and science.

Philosophy of language

Counterfactuals

A counterfactual statement is a conditional statement with a false antecedent. For example, the statement "If Joseph Swan had not invented the modern incandescent light bulb, then someone else would have invented it anyway" is a counterfactual, because in fact, Joseph Swan invented the modern incandescent light bulb. The most immediate task concerning counterfactuals is that of explaining their truth-conditions. As a start, one might assert that background information is assumed when stating and interpreting counterfactual conditionals and that this background information is just every true statement about the world as it is (pre-counterfactual). In the case of the Swan statement, we have certain trends in the history of technology, the utility of artificial light, the discovery of electricity, and so on. We quickly encounter an error with this initial account: among the true statements will be "Joseph Swan did invent the modern incandescent light bulb." From the conjunction of this statement (call it "S") and the antecedent of the counterfactual ("¬S"), we can derive any conclusion, and we have the unwelcome result that any statement follows from any counterfactual (see the principle of explosion). Nelson Goodman takes up this and related issues in his seminal Fact, Fiction, and Forecast; and David Lewis's influential articulation of possible world theory is popularly applied in efforts to solve it.

Epistemology

Gettier problem

Plato suggests, in his Theaetetus (210a) and Meno (97a–98b), that "knowledge" may be defined as justified true belief. For over two millennia, this definition of knowledge was accepted by subsequent philosophers. An item of information's justifiability, truth, and belief were seen as the necessary and sufficient conditions for knowledge.

But in 1963, Edmund Gettier published an article in the journal Analysis, a peer-reviewed academic journal of philosophy, entitled "Is Justified True Belief Knowledge?" which offered instances of justified true belief that do not conform to the generally understood meaning of "knowledge." Gettier's examples hinged on instances of epistemic luck: cases where a person appears to have sound evidence for a proposition, and that proposition is in fact true, but the apparent evidence is not causally related to the proposition's truth.

In response to Gettier's article, numerous philosophers have offered modified criteria for "knowledge." There is no general consensus to adopt any of the modified definitions yet proposed. Finally, if infallibilism is true, that would seem to definitively solve the Gettier problem for good. Infallibilism states that knowledge requires certainty, such that, certainty is what serves to bridge the gap so that we arrive at knowledge, which means we would have an adequate definition of knowledge. However, infallibilism is rejected by the overwhelming majority of philosophers/epistemologists.

Problem of the criterion

Overlooking for a moment the complications posed by Gettier problems, philosophy has essentially continued to operate on the principle that knowledge is justified true belief. The obvious question that this definition entails is how one can know whether one's justification is sound. One must therefore provide a justification for the justification. That justification itself requires justification, and the questioning continues interminably.

The conclusion is that no one can truly have knowledge of anything, since it is, due to this infinite regression, impossible to satisfy the justification element. In practice, this has caused little concern to philosophers, since the demarcation between a reasonably exhaustive investigation and superfluous investigation is usually clear.

Others argue for forms of coherentist systems, e.g. Susan Haack. Recent work by Peter D. Klein views knowledge as essentially defeasible. Therefore, an infinite regress is unproblematic, since any known fact may be overthrown on sufficiently in-depth investigation.

Problem of induction

Intuitively, it seems to be the case that we know certain things with absolute, complete, utter, unshakable certainty. For example, if you travel to the Arctic and touch an iceberg, you know that it would feel cold. These things that we know from experience are known through induction. The problem of induction in short; (1) any inductive statement (like the sun will rise tomorrow) can only be deductively shown if one assumes that nature is uniform. (2) the only way to show that nature is uniform is by using induction. Thus induction cannot be justified deductively.

Molyneux problem

The Molyneux problem dates back to the following question posed by William Molyneux to John Locke in the 17th century: if a man born blind, and able to distinguish by touch between a cube and a globe, were made to see, could he now tell by sight which was the cube and which the globe, before he touched them? The problem raises fundamental issues in epistemology and the philosophy of mind, and was widely discussed after Locke included it in the second edition of his Essay Concerning Human Understanding.

A similar problem was also addressed earlier in the 12th century by Ibn Tufail (Abubacer), in his philosophical novel, Hayy ibn Yaqdhan (Philosophus Autodidactus). His version of the problem, however, dealt mainly with colors rather than shapes.

Modern science may now have the tools necessary to test this problem in controlled environments. The resolution of this problem is in some sense provided by the study of human subjects who gain vision after extended congenital blindness. In one such study, subjects were unable to immediately link objects known by touch to their visual appearance, and only gradually developed the ability to do so over a period of days or months. This indicates that this may no longer be an unsolved problem in philosophy.

Münchhausen trilemma
The Münchhausen trilemma, also called Agrippa's trilemma, purports that it is impossible to prove any certain truth even in fields such as logic and mathematics. According to this argument, the proof of any theory rests either on circular reasoning, infinite regress, or unproven axioms.

Metaphysics

Why there is something rather than nothing

The question about why is there anything at all instead of nothing has been raised or commented on by philosophers including Gottfried Wilhelm Leibniz, Martin Heidegger − who called it the fundamental question of metaphysics − and Ludwig Wittgenstein. The question is general, rather than concerning the existence of anything specific such as the universe/s, the Big Bang, mathematical laws, physical laws, time, consciousness or God.

Problem of universals

The problem of universals refers to the question of whether properties exist, and if so, what they are. Properties are qualities or relations or names that two or more entities have in common. The various kinds of properties, such as qualities and relations, are referred to as universals. For instance, one can imagine three cup holders on a table that have in common the quality of being circular or exemplifying circularity, or bear the same name, "circular cup" or two daughters that have in common being the female offsprings of Frank. There are many such properties, such as being human, red, male or female, liquid, big or small, taller than, father of, etc. While philosophers agree that human beings talk and think about properties, they disagree on whether these universals exist in reality or merely in thought, speech and sight.

Principle of individuation

Related to the problem of universals, the principle of individuation is what individuates universals.

Sorites paradox

Otherwise known as the "paradox of the heap", the question regards how one defines a "thing." Is a bale of hay still a bale of hay if you remove one straw? If so, is it still a bale of hay if you remove another straw? If you continue this way, you will eventually deplete the entire bale of hay, and the question is: at what point is it no longer a bale of hay? While this may initially seem like a superficial problem, it penetrates to fundamental issues regarding how we define objects. This is similar to Theseus' paradox and the continuum fallacy.

Theseus paradox 
Also known as the ship of Theseus, this is a classical paradox on the first branch of metaphysics, ontology (philosophy of existence and identity). The paradox runs thus: There used to be the great ship of Theseus which was made out of, say, 100 parts. Each part has a single corresponding replacement part in the ship's port.  Over the centuries, each part is replaced individually as it breaks, and eventually, not a single original part of the ship remains.  Is this new ship the ship of Theseus or not?

If yes, consider this: the broken original parts are repaired and re-assembled. Is this the ship of Theseus or not? If not, let us name the new ship "The Argo". At what point did the crew of the Theseus become the crew of the Argo? And what ship is sailing when 50 of the parts have been replaced? If both the ships trade a single piece, are they still the same ships?

This paradox is a minor variation of the Sorites Paradox above, and has many variations itself. Both sides of the paradox have convincing arguments and counter-arguments, though no one is close to proving it completely.

Material implication

People have a rather clear idea of what if-then means. In formal logic however, material implication defines if-then, which is not consistent with the common understanding of conditionals. In formal logic, the statement "If today is Saturday, then 1+1=2" is true. However, '1+1=2' is true regardless of the content of the antecedent; a causal or meaningful relation is not required. The statement as a whole must be true, because 1+1=2 cannot be false. (If it could, then on a given Saturday, so could the statement). Formal logic has shown itself extremely useful in formalizing argumentation, philosophical reasoning, and mathematics. The discrepancy between material implication and the general conception of conditionals however is a topic of intense investigation: whether it is an inadequacy in formal logic, an ambiguity of ordinary language, or as championed by H. P. Grice, that no discrepancy exists.

Philosophy of mind

Mind–body problem

The mind–body problem is the problem of determining the relationship between the human body and the human mind. Philosophical positions on this question are generally predicated on either a reduction of one to the other, or a belief in the discrete coexistence of both. This problem is usually exemplified by Descartes, who championed a dualistic picture. The problem therein is to establish how the mind and body communicate in a dualistic framework. Neurobiology and emergence have further complicated the problem by allowing the material functions of the mind to be a representation of some further aspect emerging from the mechanistic properties of the brain. The brain essentially stops generating conscious thought during deep sleep; the ability to restore such a pattern remains a mystery to science and is a subject of current research (see also neurophilosophy).

Qualia

The question hinges on whether color is a product of the mind or an inherent property of objects. While most philosophers will agree that color assignment corresponds to spectra of light frequencies, it is not at all clear whether the particular psychological phenomena of color are imposed on these visual signals by the mind, or whether such qualia are somehow naturally associated with their noumena. Another way to look at this question is to assume two people ("Fred" and "George" for the sake of convenience) see colors differently. That is, when Fred sees the sky, his mind interprets this light signal as blue. He calls the sky "blue." However, when George sees the sky, his mind assigns green to that light frequency. If Fred were able to step into George's mind, he would be amazed that George saw green skies. However, George has learned to associate the word "blue" with what his mind sees as green, and so he calls the sky "blue", because for him the color green has the name "blue." The question is whether blue must be blue for all people, or whether the perception of that particular color is assigned by the mind.

This extends to all areas of the physical reality, where the outside world we perceive is merely a representation of what is impressed upon the senses. The objects we see are in truth wave-emitting (or reflecting) objects which the brain shows to the conscious self in various forms and colors. Whether the colors and forms experienced perfectly match between person to person, may never be known. That people can communicate accurately shows that the order and proportionality in which experience is interpreted is generally reliable. Thus one's reality is, at least, compatible to another person's in terms of structure and ratio.

Hard problem of consciousness

The hard problem of consciousness is the question of what consciousness is and why we have consciousness as opposed to being philosophical zombies. The adjective "hard" is to contrast with the "easy" consciousness problems, which seek to explain the mechanisms of consciousness ("why" versus "how", or final cause versus efficient cause). The hard problem of consciousness is questioning whether all beings undergo an experience of consciousness rather than questioning the neurological makeup of beings.

Cognition and AI
This problem actually defines a field; however, its pursuits are specific and easily stated. Firstly, what are the criteria for intelligence? What are the necessary components for defining consciousness? Secondly, how can an outside observer test for these criteria? The "Turing Test" is often cited as a prototypical test of intelligence, although it is almost universally regarded as insufficient. It involves a conversation between a sentient being and a machine, and if the being can't tell he is talking to a machine, it is considered intelligent. A well trained machine, however, could theoretically "parrot" its way through the test. This raises the corollary question of whether it is possible to artificially create consciousness (usually in the context of computers or machines), and of how to tell a well-trained mimic from a sentient entity.

Important thought in this area includes most notably: John Searle's Chinese Room, Hubert Dreyfus' non-cognitivist critique, as well as Hilary Putnam's work on functionalism.

A related field is the ethics of artificial intelligence, which addresses such problems as the existence of moral personhood of AIs, the possibility of moral obligations to AIs (for instance, the right of a possibly sentient computer system to not be turned off), and the question of making AIs that behave ethically towards humans and others.

Philosophy of mathematics

Mathematical objects

What are numbers, sets, groups, points, etc.? Are they real objects or are they simply relationships that necessarily exist in all structures? Although many disparate views exist regarding what a mathematical object is, the discussion may be roughly partitioned into two opposing schools of thought: platonism, which asserts that mathematical objects are real, and formalism, which asserts that mathematical objects are merely formal constructions. This dispute may be better understood when considering specific examples, such as the "continuum hypothesis". The continuum hypothesis has been proven independent of the ZF axioms of set theory, so within that system, the proposition can neither be proven true nor proven false. A formalist would therefore say that the continuum hypothesis is neither true nor false, unless you further refine the context of the question. A platonist, however, would assert that there either does or does not exist a transfinite set with a cardinality less than the continuum but greater than any countable set. So, regardless of whether it has been proven unprovable, the platonist would argue that an answer nonetheless does exist.

Philosophy of science

Demarcation problem

'The problem of demarcation' is an expression introduced by Karl Popper to refer to 'the problem of finding a criterion which would enable us to distinguish between the empirical sciences on the one hand, and mathematics and logic as well as "metaphysical" systems on the other'. Popper attributes this problem to Kant. Although Popper mentions mathematics and logic, other writers focus on distinguishing science from metaphysics.

A prominent question in meta-philosophy is that of whether or not philosophical progress occurs and more so, whether such progress in philosophy is even possible.[3] It has even been disputed, most notably by Ludwig Wittgenstein, whether genuine philosophical problems actually exist. The opposite has also been claimed, for example by Karl Popper, who held that such problems do exist, that they are solvable, and that he had actually found definite solutions to some of them. David Chalmers divides inquiry into philosophical progress in meta-philosophy into three questions. The Existence Question: is there progress in philosophy? The Comparison Question: is there as much progress in philosophy as in science? The Explanation Question: why isn't there more progress in philosophy?[4]

Realism

Does a world independent of human beliefs and representations exist? Is such a world empirically accessible, or would such a world be forever beyond the bounds of human sense and hence unknowable? Can human activity and agency change the objective structure of the world? These questions continue to receive much attention in the philosophy of science. A clear "yes" to the first question is a hallmark of the scientific realism perspective. Philosophers such as Bas van Fraassen have important and interesting answers to the second question. In addition to the realism vs. empiricism axis of debate, there is a realism vs. social constructivism axis which heats many academic passions. With respect to the third question, Paul Boghossian's Fear of Knowledge: Against Relativism and Constructivism is a powerful critique of social constructivism, for instance. Ian Hacking's The Social Construction of What? constitutes a more moderate critique of constructivism, which usefully disambiguates confusing polysemy of the term "constructivism."

Relationship between science and religion

What is the relationship between science and religion? Philosophers like Paul Feyerabend, A. C. Grayling, and Alvin Plantinga have debated whether they are in conflict, incompatible, incommensurable, or independent.

Philosophy of religion
Philosophy of religion encompasses attempts within metaphysics, epistemology, ethics, and other major philosophical fields to philosophically analyze concepts within religion, the nature of religion itself, and alternatives to religion.

Existence of God

Does God exist? A rich variety of arguments including forms of the contingency argument, ontological argument, and moral argument have been proposed by philosophers like Aristotle, Descartes, Leibniz, Gödel, and Aquinas for the existence of God throughout history. Arguments for God usually refer to some form of metaphysically or logically necessary maximally great being distinct from individual deities, although philosophers have also proposed different concepts of God. Wittgenstein and Kant, on the other hand, defended religious belief while doubting that rational arguments could prove God's existence. Philosophers have also considered objections to the existence of God like the problem of evil and divine hiddenness.

Nature of God

What is God like? Philosophers like John Stuart Mill and Aquinas addressed the question of what the nature of God is if God exists. Some of the key disagreements concern the doctrine of impassibility and the coherency of a maximally great being or properties like omnipotence.

Epistemology of religion

Can religious belief be justified? When? According to the Cambridge Dictionary of Philosophy, religious epistemology "investigates the epistemic status of propositional attitudes about religious claims." Philosophers like Kant, Kierkegaard, William James, and Alvin Plantinga have debated stances towards the epistemic status of religious belief like reformed epistemology, fideism, and evidentialism.

Ethics

Moral luck

The problem of moral luck is that some people are born into, live within, and experience circumstances that seem to change their moral culpability when all other factors remain the same.

For instance, a case of circumstantial moral luck: a poor person is born into a poor family, and has no other way to feed himself so he steals his food. Another person, born into a very wealthy family, does very little but has ample food and does not need to steal to get it. Should the poor person be more morally blameworthy than the rich person? After all, it is not this person's fault that they were born into such circumstances, but a matter of "luck".

A related case is resultant moral luck. For instance, two persons behave in a morally culpable way, such as driving carelessly, but end up producing unequal amounts of harm: two people drive while intoxicated, but one strikes a pedestrian and kills him, while the other does not. That one driver caused a death and the other did not is no part of the drivers' intentional actions; yet most observers would likely ascribe greater blame to the driver who killed (compare consequentialism and choice).

The fundamental question of moral luck is how our moral responsibility is changed by factors over which we have no control.

Moral knowledge
Are moral facts possible, what do they consist in, and how do we come to know them? Rightness and wrongness seem to be strange kinds of entities, and different from the usual properties of things in the world, such as wetness, redness, or solidity. Richmond Campbell has outlined these kinds of issues in his encyclopedia article "Moral Epistemology".

In particular, he considers three alternative explanations of moral facts as: theological, (supernatural, the commands of God); non-natural (based on intuitions); or simply natural properties (such as leading to pleasure or to happiness). There are cogent arguments against each of these alternative accounts, he claims, and there has not been any fourth alternative proposed. So the existence of moral knowledge and moral facts remains dubious and in need of further investigation. But moral knowledge supposedly already plays an important part in our everyday thinking, in our legal systems  and criminal investigations.

See also
 Thought experiment
 List of paradoxes

References

Philosophy
Unsolved problems